Black butter can refer to:

Cookery
 Beurre noir, a simple sauce prepared from butter and lemon juice or vinegar. Typically served with fish, such as in the classic dish of skate with black butter.
 Known in Jèrriais as lé nièr beurre, a dark spicy spread prepared from apples, cider and spices (including liquorice), a traditional speciality of Jersey. It is a variety of apple butter.

Mineralogy
 A type of dacite obtained near the obsidian flows at Glass Buttes, Oregon: so named for its colour and ease of working.

Music
 Black Butter Records, a UK based record label that releases J Hus, Will Heard, Young T & Bugsey, among other artists.